"Self-Defence Against Fresh Fruit" is a Monty Python sketch that appeared in the episode "Owl Stretching Time". It is about an RSM-type instructor who is teaching a class about self-defence, but all he teaches is how to defend oneself against an assailant "armed" with a piece of fresh fruit.

The first half or so of the sketch was remade for the Pythons' first feature film, And Now for Something Completely Different.

Plot 

The teacher (John Cleese) is about to start off his class, but he notices that everyone, save for four students, is absent. He starts off the class by carrying on from where they got to last week when he was showing them how to defend themselves against anyone who attacks with a piece of fresh fruit. The class complains that for the last nine weeks, all he's been teaching them is fruit. One student (Eric Idle) keeps on insisting that they should be taught how to defend themselves against anyone who attacks with a pointed stick. The teacher berates the student for thinking that pointed sticks are more dangerous than fresh fruit, saying, in a drill-sergeant style tone of voice, "Ooh, ooh, ooh; we want to learn how to defend ourselves against pointed sticks, do we? Getting all high and mighty, eh? Fresh fruit not good enough for you, eh? Well, let me tell you something, my lad! When you're walking home tonight and some great homicidal maniac comes after YOU with a bunch of loganberries, don't come cryin' to me!"

He starts off the class with passionfruit, but the whole class complains that they've already done passionfruit, in addition to oranges, apples, grapefruit (whole and segmented), pomegranates, greengages, grapes, lemons, plums, mangoes in syrup, and cherries (red and black). The teacher then hits upon the fact he has yet to teach them about bananas. He tells them to defend themselves against a man armed with a banana, first he has to be forced to drop the banana, then the banana has to be eaten, thus disarming him and rendering him helpless. When another student (Michael Palin) asks about a man armed with a bunch of bananas, the teacher tells him to shut up. He demonstrates by asking a student called Mr. Harrison (Graham Chapman, whom the teacher calls Mr. Apricot), to attack him with a banana, but just as Harrison is about to attack him, the teacher shoots him dead and eats the banana. (The movie version ends here.)

Next, he asks student Mr. Thompson (Terry Jones, whom the teacher calls Mr. Tinned Peach), to attack him with a raspberry, but Thompson refuses, saying that the teacher will shoot him. The teacher says that he won't and throws away the gun, and Thompson is about to attack him when a 16-ton weight comes down on him. The teacher then asks the remaining students to do the same, but they refuse until he promises not to kill them.  As the students advance with baskets of raspberries, the teacher releases a tiger which attacks the remaining students while the teacher expounds on the great advantage of using a tiger against raspberry-laden foes; it not only eats them but also the raspberries. ("The tiger, however, does not relish the peach! The peach assailant should be attacked with a crocodile!") The teacher warns imaginary other students that he's wired himself up to 200 tons of gelignite, and blows himself up.

Sixteen ton weight
This sketch was the first appearance of Monty Python's 16-ton weight. In the typical style of a comedy or cartoon weight, it was colored black, in shape of a right square frustum, and had its mass "16 TONS" painted on the side in large white letters. Monty Python's sixteen-ton weight was hollow lightweight board and approximately 1.5m high, allowing it to readily conceal the character upon whom it was dropped. The sixteen-ton weight was used periodically thereafter to bring an abrupt ending to sketches (in much the same way as the knight with a rubber chicken would do during the first series).
A later episode would end with the weight being dropped on a TV announcer (played by Palin) and in the instant before cutting to a black screen, the viewer can see the top of the prop being broken due to Palin not ducking down fast enough.

In popular culture
This sketch was referenced briefly in Lemony Snicket's The Slippery Slope, in which three characters are searching for something important in a refrigerator, and Snicket says that a fridge would hold a bunch of strawberries, which would be important if a man said "If you don't give me a bunch of strawberries right now, I'm going to attack you with this large pointed stick".

A parody of this sketch appeared in Alexei Sayle's Stuff, with the premise changed to defending yourself against an attacker using Wildean put-downs.

The name of Canadian punk rock/new wave band The Pointed Sticks refers to this sketch.

A piece of Python documentation illustrates the use of list comprehensions by adding fresh fruit like bananas, loganberries and the passion fruit to a list as "weapons," referring to this sketch.

References

Further reading
Monty Python Scripts: Self-defense against Fresh Fruit MontyPython.50webs.com

Monty Python sketches